Santa María del Rosario  is a town and municipality in Oaxaca in south-western Mexico. The municipality covers an area of  km². 
It is part of the Tlaxiaco District in the south of the Mixteca Region.

As of the 2010 census, the town (locality) had a population of 55 inhabitants, while the municipality for which it serves as municipal seat (cabecera municipal) had a total population of 480 inhabitants. Although the municipality is far from the least populous in Mexico (there are dozens of smaller ones in its own State of Oaxaca, and three others in the State of Sonora), its municipal seat is the smallest in all of Mexico. It is the only urban locality in the municipality.

References

Municipalities of Oaxaca